Strangled is a 2016 Hungarian neo-noir crime film directed by Árpád Sopsits. It stars Zsolt Anger, Mónika Balsai, and Zsófia Szamosi. The film was adapted from the story of a serial killer in Hungary 1960s, under the rule of the communist party.

References

External links
 

2016 films
Neo-noir
Hungarian crime films